Psicodeliamorsexo&distorção (English: Psychedeliclovesex&distortion) is the third studio album by rock band Detonautas. It was released in 2006 by Warner Music.

Track listing
 "No Escuro o Sangue Escorre" 
 "Não Reclame Mais"
 "Sonhos Verdes"
 "Assim que Tem que Ser"
 "Quem Sou Eu?" 
 "Dia Comum"
 "Prosseguir" 
 "Você Me Faz Tão Bem" 
 "Ela Não Sabe (Mas Nós Sabemos)"
 "Apague a Luz" 
 "Insone" 
 "Tudo O Que Eu Falei Dormindo"
 "Um Pouco Só do Seu Veneno" 
 "The Wrong Life in the Right Way" (Hidden track)

Credits 
 Tico Santa Cruz – Vocals
 Renato Rocha – Lead guitars, backing vocals
 Rodrigo Netto – Rhythm guitars
 Cléston – DJ
 Fábio Brasil – Drums

References

2006 albums
Detonautas Roque Clube albums